Hajji Piri or Khvajeh Piri or Agha Piri and later known as Mohammad Piri was a Safavid official of Armenian origin. He served during the reign of King (Shah) Suleiman I (1666–1694) as mayor (kalāntar) of New Julfa, and briefly as controller of the assay (mo'ayyer ol-mamalek). He was also one of the wealthiest merchants in the Safavid state.

Biography
Hajji Piri is known to have converted on two occasions. On the first occasion, he converted from Oriental Orthodoxy (Armenian Apostolic Church) to Catholicism. Catholic Armenians were considered outsiders by Apostolic Armenians, and were dubbed Frangs (i.e. "Franks"). On the second occasion (24 August 1673), Hajji Piri converted from Catholicism to Shia Islam. According to French traveler Jean Chardin, Hajji Piri knew that his conversion to Islam would stir up trouble among New Julfan Armenians, as he was the community's leader and most important member. Chardin tells that two weeks before his apostasy, Hajji Piri went to the royal Safavid court and begged the nazer ("steward") to make it seem like a forced conversion. Hajji Piri managed to convince the nazer to help him by giving him 600 ducats. In addition, he told that if his conversion came to be known as a voluntary act, the Armenian merchants abroad would not come back, and would settle in Europe while keeping their goods and money. This would cause grave economic loss. Thus, the nazer decided to help Hajji Piri and reportedly staged a scene, saying loudly: "the Shah orders you to become Moslem, he must be contented".

Ina Baghdiantz-McCabe notes that Hajji Piri wanted it to look like a forced conversion for economic reasons. He was given the name Mohammad Piri after conversion. Baghdiantz-McCabe notes that Hajji Piri was not only the mayor (kalāntar) of New Julfa, but also one of the richest merchants in the country. According to Chardin, after conversion, he married a daughter of a prominent member of the Queen Mother's household. In 1692–1693, he served as mo'ayyer ol-mamalek ("controller of the assay"), which signifies that he had risen to even greater prominence. In the year following his appointment, in 1693–1694, Hajji Piri resigned from his post as controller of the assay. He died a month later.

References

Sources
 
 
 
 

1690s deaths
Persian Armenians
Ethnic Armenian Shia Muslims
Controllers of the assay of the Safavid Empire
Converts to Shia Islam from Catholicism
Safavid mayors of New Julfa
Armenian former Christians
17th-century people of Safavid Iran